The FIBT World Championships 1966 took place in Cortina d'Ampezzo, Italy for the sixth time, having hosted the event previously in 1937 (Two-man), 1939 (Four-man), 1950, 1954, and 1960. The Four-man event was cancelled following the death of West Germany's Toni Pensperger during competition. Pensperger would be awarded a posthumous gold medal from the FIBT along with his surviving teammates Ludwig Siebert, Helmut Werzer, and Roland Ebert. , Pensperger's death would set the FIBT to increase and improve safety among all bobsleigh competitions at all levels, including the Winter Olympics and the World championships.

Two man bobsleigh

Four man bobsleigh
This event was cancelled when Toni Pensperger of West Germany was killed during competition. Pensperger was awarded a posthumous gold medal along with his grieving teammates (Siebert, Werzer, and Ebert).

Medal table

References
2-Man bobsleigh World Champions
4-Man bobsleigh World Champions

1966
1966 in Italian sport
Sport in Cortina d'Ampezzo
1966 in bobsleigh
International sports competitions hosted by Italy
Bobsleigh in Italy